Quedius is a genus of large rove beetles in the family Staphylinidae. There are about 800 described species in Quedius.

Species
 Quedius brunnipennis Mannerheim, 1843
 Quedius canadensis (Casey, 1915)
 Quedius capucinus (Gravenhorst, 1806)
 Quedius cinctus (Paykull, 1790)
 Quedius cruentus (Olivier, 1975)
 Quedius curtipennis
 Quedius erythrogaster
 Quedius explanatus
 Quedius fulvicollis (Stephens, 1833)
 Quedius laticollis
 Quedius limbifer
 Quedius molochinoides Smetana, 1965
 Quedius pediculus (Nordmann, 1837)
 Quedius peregrinus (Gravenhorst, 1806)
 Quedius plagiatus Mannerheim, 1846
 Quedius prostans Horn, 1878
 Quedius simulator

References

Other sources

 Brunke A, Marshall S (2011). "Contributions to the faunistics and bionomics of Staphylinidae (Coleoptera) in northeastern North America: discoveries made through study of the University of Guelph Insect Collection, Ontario, Canada". ZooKeys 75: 29–68.
 Klimaszewski J, McLean J, Chandler D, Savard K, Li A (2009). "Survey of rove beetles (Coleoptera, Staphylinidae) from Stanley Park, Vancouver, British Columbia, Canada, with new records and description of a new species. Part 2". ZooKeys 22: 19–33.
 Klimaszewski J, McLean J, Li A, Savard K (2009). "Survey of rove beetles (Coleoptera, Staphylinidae) from Stanley Park, Vancouver, British Columbia, Canada, with new records and description of a new species. Part 1". ZooKeys 22: 5–17.
 Klimaszewski J, Webster R, Savard K (2009). "Review of the rove beetle species of the subtribe Gyrophaenina Kraatz (Coleoptera, Staphylinidae) from New Brunswick, Canada: new species, provincial records and bionomic information". ZooKeys 22: 81–170.

Further reading

 Arnett, R. H. Jr., M. C. Thomas, P. E. Skelley and J. H. Frank. (eds.). (21 June 2002). American Beetles, Volume II: Polyphaga: Scarabaeoidea through Curculionoidea. CRC Press LLC, Boca Raton, Florida .
 
 Richard E. White. (1983). Peterson Field Guides: Beetles. Houghton Mifflin Company.

Staphylininae